Hexastylis sorriei is a species of flowering plant in the family Aristolochiaceae. The species was first described by L. L. Gaddy in September 2011.

Description

Range
"Hexastylis sorriei can generally said to be rare and local.  Fort Bragg and Camp Mackall [in North Carolina], where annual burning is widespread, are the only locations where the Sandhills Heartleaf can said to be common."

Habitat

Ecology

Etymology
Hexastylis sorriei was named after the botanist Bruce Alexander Sorrie.

Taxonomy

References

Aristolochiaceae